The Church League of America was founded in Chicago in 1937 to oppose left-wing and Social Gospel influences in Christian thought in organizations. The group's founders were Frank J. Loesch, a lawyer and head of the Chicago Crime Commission, Henry Parsons Crowell, chairman of the board of Quaker Oats, and George Washington Robnett, an advertising executive. The nonprofit organization became an influential anti-communist research and advocacy group in the 1950s, under the direction of former United States Air Force Intelligence Officer Major Edgar C. Bundy. It famously denounced the mainstream National Council of Churches for being dominated by communists. In 1961, the Church League moved its headquarters to Wheaton, Illinois, where it continued its research operations, and created an extensive library of materials on subversive activity. Selling reports and access to its information was a major source of revenue for the Church League, and they also sometimes provided it without charge to like-minded researchers, including members of government and law enforcement agencies. The Church League of America dissolved in 1984.

References

 The Church League of America. "What is the Church League of America?: A History of the Organization, Including its Founders, Scope of Activity, and How Individuals May Participate in its Mission".
 "The Press: Mr. Counterattack Quits". Time. June 30, 1952.
 Wilcox, Clyde. God's Warriors: The Christian Right in Twentieth-Century America. Baltimore and London: Johns Hopkins University Press, 1992.
 Central Intelligence Agency memorandum regarding the Church League of America

External links
 Guide to the Church League of America Collection of the Research Files of Counterattack, the Wackenhut Corporation, and Karl Baarslag at the Tamiment Library, New York University
 Guide to the George Washington Robnett Papers at the University of Oregon
 FBI file on the Church League of America

Anti-communist organizations in the United States
Religious organizations based in Chicago
Christian organizations established in 1937
Religious organizations disestablished in 1984
1937 establishments in Illinois
Wheaton, Illinois
Conservative organizations in the United States